S. Sukumaran Potti, commonly known as Sukumar, is a popular satirist and cartoonist from Kerala state in southern India.

He completed his education from University College, Thiruvananthapuram and joined the Kerala Police Department. He started his literary life as a cartoonist in Kerala Kaumudi and later became a full-fledged writer and satirist. Along with Veloor Krishnankutty, Sukumar was one of the most popular humour writers of his time. He received the Kerala Sahitya Akademi Award in the year 1996 for the work Vayil Vannathu Kothakku Pattu.

References

External links
Interview with Sukumar - Part 1
Interview with Sukumar - Part 2
Interview with Sukumar - Part 3

Living people
Indian satirists
Indian cartoonists
Indian police officers
Malayalam-language writers
Recipients of the Kerala Sahitya Akademi Award
University of Kerala alumni
Year of birth missing (living people)